Eurozonosia is a genus of moths in the subfamily Arctiinae.

Species
 Eurozonosia atricincta Hampson, 1918
 Eurozonosia fulvinigra Hampson, 1914
 Eurozonosia inconstans Butler, 1896

References

Natural History Museum Lepidoptera generic names catalog

Lithosiini